In archaeology, a tell, or tel (derived from , , 'hill' or 'mound'), is an artificial mound formed from the accumulated refuse of people living on the same site for hundreds or thousands of years. A classic tell looks like a low, truncated cone with sloping sides and can be up to 30 metres high.

Tells are most commonly associated with the archaeology of the ancient Near East, but they are also found elsewhere, such as Central Asia, Eastern Europe, West Africa and Greece. Within the Near East, they are concentrated in less arid regions, including Upper Mesopotamia, the Southern Levant, Anatolia and Iran.

Tells 
This is a list of notable archaeological tells in Lebanon sorted by alphabetical order:

 Tell Aalaq
 Tell Ablah
 Tell Addus
 Tell Ahle
 Tell Ain Cerif
 Tell Ain el Meten
 Tell Ain Ghessali
 Tell Ain Nfaikh
 Tell Ain Saouda
 Tell Ain Sofar
 Tell Ayoub
 Tell Bar Elias
 Tell Beshara
 Tell Bir Dakoue
 Tell Deir
 Tell Delhamieh
 Tell Derzenoun
 Tell Dibbine
 Tell el-Burak
 Tell El Ghassil
 Tell El Hadeth
 Tell Fadous
 Tell Hazzine
 Tell Hoch Rafqa
 Tell Karmita
 Tell Khardane
 Tell Kirri
 Tell Jezireh
 Tell Jisr
 Tell Kabb Elias
 Tell Majdaloun
 Tell Masoud
 Tell Mekhada
 Tell Meouchi
 Tell Mureibit
 Tell Murtafa
 Tell Nahariyah
 Tell Neba'a Chaate
 Tell Neba'a Litani
 Tell Qasr Labwe
 Tell Rasm El Hadeth
 Tell Rayak
 Tell Saatiya
 Tell Safiyeh
 Tell Saoudhi
 Tell Serhan
 Tell Shaikh Hassan al Rai
 Tell Shamsine
 Tell Sultan Yakoub
 Tell Taalabaya
 Tell Wardeen
 Tell Zenoub
 Tell Zeitoun

References

Further reading 
 

Archaeological sites in Lebanon
Lists of archaeological sites by country

Tells